Scopula irrorata is a moth of the  family Geometridae. It is found on Madeira and the Canary Islands.

The wingspan is about 26 mm. The forewings and hindwings are pale ochreous grey, finely sprinkled with dull reddish irrorations.

References

Moths described in 1891
irrorata
Moths of Africa